"Miracle" is a song by Julian Perretta released in 2015 in a collaboration with Belgian producer Lost Frequencies. The song became Perretta's biggest solo hit to date.

Charts

Weekly charts

Year-end charts

References

2015 singles
2015 songs